Recovery Road is an American teen drama television series based on the 2011 young adult novel of the same name by Blake Nelson. The show was picked up to series by ABC Family on December 16, 2014 and began production in April 2015. The first three episodes were released on demand on December 18, 2015 and debuted on the new Freeform on January 25, 2016. On May 13, 2016, it was announced that Freeform had cancelled the series.

Cast and characters

Main
 Jessica Sula as Madeline "Maddie" Graham
 Sebastian de Souza as Wesley "Wes" Stewart
 Alexis Carra as Cynthia Molina
 Daniel Franzese as Vern Testaverde
 Kyla Pratt as Trish Tomlinson
 David Witts as Craig Weiner
 Sharon Leal as Charlotte Graham
Lindsay Pearce as Rebecca Granger

Recurring
 Paula Jai Parker as Margarita Jean-Baptiste
 Haley Lu Richardson as Ellie Dennis
Meg DeLacy as Nyla
Keith Powers as Zack
Aubrey Peeples as Harper
Emma Fassler as Laurel
Brad Beyer as Paul

Episodes

Reception
Recovery Road was met with a favorable response from critics. On Metacritic, the series holds a rating of 70/100, based on five reviews.

References

External links
 
 

2016 American television series debuts
2016 American television series endings
2010s American teen drama television series
Freeform (TV channel) original programming
English-language television shows
Television shows about drugs
Television shows based on American novels
Television series about teenagers
Works about addiction
Television series by Disney–ABC Domestic Television